High Point is a mountain located in the Catskill Mountains of New York east of Ellenville. Shawangunk Ridge is located south, Mount Don Bosco is located southwest, and Napanoch Point is located north-northeast of High Point.

References

Mountains of Ulster County, New York
Mountains of New York (state)